José Ferreira (born 19 May 1934) is a former Venezuelan cyclist. He competed in the individual road race and team time trial events at the 1960 Summer Olympics.

References

External links
 

1934 births
Living people
Venezuelan male cyclists
Olympic cyclists of Venezuela
Cyclists at the 1960 Summer Olympics
20th-century Venezuelan people